Yitzhak Tabenkin (8 January 1888 – 6 June 1971) was a Zionist activist and Israeli politician. He was one of the founders of the kibbutz Movement.

Biography

Yitzchak Tabenkin was born in Babruysk in the Russian Empire (now Belarus) in 1888. He attended a cheder in Warsaw and later continued with a secular education. He was among the founders of Poale Zion in Poland. He cited Karl Marx and Haim Nahman Bialik as influences.

In 1912, he immigrated to Ottoman Palestine, where he worked as an agricultural laborer in Merhavia and Kfar Uria. During the First World War, he worked on the Kinneret Farm. He was a delegate to every Zionist Congress after the war.

He joined the defense organization HaShomer. He was a member of the "Non-Party" workers group and was active in agricultural laborers organizations in what would later be called the West Bank. In 1921 he joined Joseph Trumpeldor's Work Battalion (Gdud HaAvoda) and became one of the founders of the first kibbutz proper (as opposed to smaller-scale kvutza), Ein Harod, which later became the center of the kibbutz movement, where he was considered a spiritual leader. He went on a mission on behalf of "Hechalutz" to Poland to encourage emigration to Palestine (aliyah).

He disapproved of the idea of Jewish statehood and advocated a "bottom up" approach to Jewish socialism. He believed this should be achieved in the "Whole Land of Israel". He regarded the political borders of the Middle East following the partition of the Ottoman Empire as imposed by European imperialism. He expressed a vision of the entire Jewish people living in communes as part of a "worldwide alliance of communist peoples". He referred to the Great Revolt as an event that perpetuated the Jewish national existence.

He lived at Ein Harod until his death. Moshav Yitav (a Hebrew acronym for "Yad Yitzhak Tabenkin") in the Jordan Valley is named after him. Yitzhak Tabenkin's son, Joseph Tabenkin, became the Fourth Battalion commander of the Palmach's Harel Brigade.

Political career
Tabenkin was one of the founders of Ahdut HaAvoda. In 1930, he became one of the founders of Mapai and one of its leaders along with David Ben-Gurion and Berl Katznelson. He opposed the Peel Commission's recommendations and any of Ben-Gurion's attempts to reach a compromise with the Revisionist Zionists.

In 1944 he led the "Bet" Faction that split from Mapai and created the new "Ahdut HaAvoda" party. In 1948 he was one of the founders of the more pro-Soviet Mapam, and was elected to the first Knesset in 1949. In 1954 he resigned from Mapam along with Ahdut HaAvoda over the issue of relationships with the Soviet Union and remained the leader of Ahdut HaAvoda until the establishment of the Labor Party in 1968. He was reelected to the third Knesset in 1955.

After the Sinai War of 1956, he opposed Israel's withdrawal and compared it to the Munich Agreement. He said Israel's right to the Sinai Peninsula and the Gaza Strip was derived from the Ten Commandments and the blood of the soldiers killed in the war. During the 1960s, he maintained that the 1949 Armistice Agreements would not last. In June 1966, he said "Anywhere war will allow, we shall go to restore the country's integrity".

After the Six-Day War of 1967, he opposed any territorial concession. He considered the addition of over a million Arabs to Israel's population a problem that could be solved by a massive aliyah. He believed Israel's victory would awaken the Jewish Diaspora and joined the "Movement for Greater Israel".

A collection of Yitzhak Tabenkin's personal papers and correspondence is stored today at the "Tabenkin Memorial" (Yad Tabenkin) in Ramat Ef'al.

Published works
 The Jewish State and the Way to Achieve It (1944) 
 Kibbutz Society (1954) 
 There is No Where to Pullback To (1968) 
 Lessons of the Six Day War (1970) 
 Issues (Four Volumes of Articles) (1967)

References

Bibliography

External links

1888 births
1971 deaths
19th-century Polish Jews
Poale Zion politicians
Emigrants from the Russian Empire to the Ottoman Empire
Members of the Assembly of Representatives (Mandatory Palestine)
Jewish socialists
Jewish National Council members
Ahdut HaAvoda politicians
Mapam politicians
Mapai politicians
Movement for Greater Israel politicians
Members of the 1st Knesset (1949–1951)
Members of the 3rd Knesset (1955–1959)